The Cincinnati Public Landing is the landing on the banks of the Ohio River in Cincinnati, Ohio, United States.

The Cincinnati Public Landing by 1825 had shipbuilding facilities. In the age of steamboat transport, the public landing was frequently jammed with riverboat traffic with 5,000 arrivals and departures per season.

The historic showboat Majestic was moored at the Public Landing until it was sold in 2019 at public auction and relocated to Manchester, Ohio.

References 

Transportation buildings and structures in Cincinnati
Transportation buildings and structures in Ohio